Ruth Bachhuber Doyle (October 14, 1916 – May 6, 2006) was an American politician and educator from Wisconsin.

Early life
Ruth Bachhuber was born in Milwaukee, Wisconsin on October 14, 1916, to Mabel (née Foley) and Frank E. Bachhuber. She went to elementary and high schools in Wausau, Wisconsin. Doyle received a Bachelor of Arts from the University of Wisconsin–Madison in 1938 and a Master of Arts from Columbia University in 1939.

Career
Doyle was a teacher. She worked for the Office of Alien Property Custodian in Washington, D.C. Doyle  was elected to the Wisconsin State Assembly, as a Democrat from Dane County, Wisconsin, serving from 1949 to 1953.

She was the first woman from Dane County to be elected to the Wisconsin State Assembly. She became the fourth generation of her family to serve in the Wisconsin State Assembly following her father, Frank E. Bachhuber, grandfather, Andrew Bachhuber,  and great-grandfather, Max Bachhuber. Doyle ran for the office of Wisconsin State Treasurer and lost the election. She then served on the Dane County Board of Supervisors. Doyle also served on the Madison School Board and was president of the school board. She also served as an assistant to the Dean of the University of Wisconsin Law School.

Personal life
Ruth Bachhuber was married to United States federal judge James Edward Doyle. They met while attending the University of Wisconsin–Madison. Together, they had three children, including Jim Doyle, the former Governor of Wisconsin.

Later life and death
Doyle had Parkinson's disease later in life. She died in Madison, Wisconsin on May 6, 2006.

Awards and legacy
 The James E. and Ruth B. Doyle Chair is an endowed professorship named after Doyle and her husband.
 In 1990, the Madison School Board named the district's administration building after her.

Notes

1916 births
2006 deaths
Politicians from Milwaukee
Politicians from Madison, Wisconsin
Columbia University alumni
University of Wisconsin–Madison alumni
Educators from Wisconsin
American women educators
School board members in Wisconsin
County supervisors in Wisconsin
Members of the Wisconsin State Assembly
Women state legislators in Wisconsin
Activists from Wisconsin
20th-century American politicians
20th-century American women politicians
21st-century American women